The Technical and Special Trades Union (Tekeri) was a trade union representing private sector workers in Finland.

The union was founded in 1970 from a merger of smaller unions.  It affiliated to the Central Organisation of Finnish Trade Unions (SAK), and was given jurisdiction over all private sector workers not included in another union.  This included broadcasting staff, consultants, graphic designers, and pop musicians.  By 1998, the union had 10,701 members.

In 2000, the union merged with the Business Union, the Caretakers' Union, and the Hotel and Restaurant Workers' Union, to form the Service Union United.

References

Trade unions established in 1970
Trade unions disestablished in 2000
Trade unions in Finland
1970 establishments in Finland
2000 disestablishments in Finland